Rasa Chughtai (born Mirza Mohtashim Ali Baig; 1928 – 2018) was a Pakistani poet in Urdu who was known for Zanjeer-e-Hamsaigi and Tere Aane Ka Intezaar Raha.

Personal life
Chughtai was born in Sawai Madhopur, Rajasthan in 1928. In 1951, he migrated from India to Pakistan.
On 5 January 2018, he died in Karachi.

Works
He was author of following works:
 Rekta
 Zanjeer-e-Hamsaigi
 Tere Aane Ka Intezaar Raha

References

1928 births
2018 deaths
Pakistani people of Rajasthani descent
People from Sawai Madhopur district
Poets from Karachi
Urdu-language poets from Pakistan